D. William Brosnan (1903-1985) was a president of Southern Railway in the USA, a railroad that later merged with Norfolk and Western Railway to form Norfolk Southern Railway. 

Born in 1903 in Albany, Georgia, he was the son of the town's fire chief. In 1923, he took a job as an engineer with the Georgia Department of Highways, before taking a job at as an apprentice student engineer for the Southern Railway, three years later, maintaining the right-of-way.

Between 1931 and 1952, he had several promotions, from apprentice student engineer to junior engineer, to division superintendent, to general manager of the Central Lines of the Southern Railway, to vice president of operations. 

During his time as chief engineer for the Western Lines of the Southern Railway, in 1945 and 1946, he oversaw an increased mechanization of track maintenance and construction on the Southern Railway, and during his time as general manager for the Central Lines, he oversaw the automation of freight car classification in yards and terminals.   He succeeded Harry A. DeButts as President in 1962.  

In 1964 Brosnan was selected as the first recipient of the Man of the Year award by Modern Railways magazine, an award now presented by Railway Age magazine as the Railroader of the Year.

He was succeeded as President by W. Graham Claytor, Jr.

He remained on the board of directors of the Southern until 1983. Brosnan died in 1985.

See also
List of railroad executives

References 

1985 deaths
20th-century American railroad executives
Southern Railway (U.S.)
1903 births
People from Albany, Georgia